Kennicott or Kennecott may refer to:

 Kennecott, Alaska, an abandoned mining camp, United States
 Benjamin Kennicott (1718-1783), English churchman and Hebrew scholar
 Robert Kennicott (1835-1866), American naturalist and pioneer Alaska explorer
 Kennecott Utah Copper, operators of a large open pit copper mine, United States
 Kennecott Utah Copper rail line
 Kennecott Land, a land development company based in Murray, Utah, United States
 MV Kennicott, an Alaska state ferry, United States

See also
 Robert Kennicutt (born 1951), American astronomer